Disporum (commonly known as fairy bells) is a genus of about 20 species of perennial flowering plants, found in Asia from northern India to Japan, south to Indonesia and north into the Russian Far East.

Taxonomy
Disporum pullum, from China, was first named by Salisbury in 1812, but subsequent authors places it in other genera such as Streptopus and Uvularia, till Don published the first valid description in 1825.

In the APG III classification system, it is placed in the family Colchicaceae. The genus previously included five species in North America, but these have been separated as the genus Prosartes D.Don and moved to the family Liliaceae in accordance to differences in karyology and chemistry as well as results from molecular systematic investigations. The type species is Disporum pullum Salisb., which is a synonym of Disporum cantoniense.

 Species
 Disporum acuminatissimum W.L.Sha - Guangxi
 Disporum acuminatum C.H.Wright - Myanmar
 Disporum bodinieri (H.Lév. & Vaniot) F.T.Wang & Tang - Guizhou, Hunan, Sichuan, Tibet, Yunnan
 Disporum calcaratum D.Don - Yunnan, Himalayas, N Indochina
 Disporum cantoniense (Lour.) Merr. - S China, S + SE Asia
 Disporum hainanense Merr. - Guangdong, Hainan
 Disporum jinfoshanense X.Z.Li, D.M.Zhang & D.Y.Hong - Chongqing
 Disporum kawakamii Hayata - Taiwan
 Disporum leucanthum H.Hara - S China, E Himalayas
 Disporum longistylum (Chinese fairy bells) (H.Lév. & Vaniot) H.Hara - C + SW China
 Disporum lutescens Koidz. - Japan
 Disporum megalanthum F.T.Wang & Tang - C China
 Disporum nantouense S.S.Ying - Taiwan
 Disporum sessile (Japanese fairy bells) (Thunb.) D.Don - Japan, Korea, Kuril Is, Sakhalin
 Disporum shimadae Hayata - Taiwan
 Disporum smilacinum A.Gray - Japan, Korea, Kuril Is, Sakhalin, Shandong
 Disporum tonkinense Koyama - N Vietnam
 Disporum trabeculatum Gagnep. - S China, Vietnam
 Disporum uniflorum Baker ex S.Moore - China, Korea
 Disporum viridescens (Maxim.) Nakai - China, Japan, Korea, Russian Far East

 Excluded species in North America
 Disporum hookeri (Torr.) G.Nicholson – now Prosartes hookeri Torr. - Hooker's fairy bells
 Disporum lanuginosum (Michx.) G.Nicholson – now Prosartes lanuginosa (Michx.) D.Don - yellow mandarin
 Disporum maculatum (Buckley) Britton – now Prosartes maculata (Buckley) A.Gray - spotted or nodding mandarin
 Disporum smithii (Hook.) Piper – now Prosartes smithii (Hook.) Utech, Shinwari & Kawano - Smith's fairy bells
 Disporum trachycarpum (S.Watson) Benth. & Hook.f. – now Prosartes trachycarpa S.Watson - rough-fruited fairy bells

Notes

References

Bibliography

External links
 Jepson Manual Treatment

Colchicaceae genera